Amina Claudine Myers (born March 21, 1942)  is an American jazz pianist, organist, vocalist, composer, and arranger.

Biography
Born in Blackwell, Arkansas, "Myers was brought up largely by her great-aunt, a schoolteacher, and her great-uncle, a carpenter by trade who played the clarinet, piano, and flute". She "started taking piano lessons around the age of four, and when she was seven, her family moved to Roosevelt, a black community outside Dallas. Myers took piano and violin lessons, but eventually, partly for financial reasons, settled on the piano, taking weekly lessons of fifteen minutes each." She began to learn some European classical music at high school, but this was interrupted when she and the family moved back to Blackwell.

Myers majored in music education at Philander Smith College in Little Rock, Arkansas. In her second year, she was invited to play at The Safari Room in Memphis, Tennessee. This engagement, however, was very brief, as her musical repertoire was too limited. After graduation, she moved in 1963 to Chicago, where she taught music at an elementary school. She also attended classes at Roosevelt University and worked with musicians such as Sonny Stitt and Gene Ammons. She was one of the performers at the AACM's second concert. In the late 1960s, Myers added "Amina" to her name.

In 1976 Myers relocated to New York City, where she intensified her compositional work and expanded it into the realm of Off-Broadway productions. She also continued performing and recording as a pianist and organist. Around 1978 she began touring in Europe with the Lester Bowie Quintet and his New York Organ Ensemble.

Discography

As leader
Poems for Piano: The Piano Music of Marion Brown (Sweet Earth, 1979)
Song for Mother E with Pheeroan akLaff (Leo, 1980)
Salutes Bessie Smith (Leo, 1980)
The Circle of Time (Black Saint, 1983)
Jumping in the Sugar Bowl (Minor Music, 1984)
Country Girl (Minor Music, 1986)
Amina (RCA Novus, 1987)
 In Touch  (RCA Novus, 1989)
Women In (E)Motion Festival (Tradition & Moderne, recorded 1988 released 2004)
Augmented Variations (Amina C records, 2004)
Sama Rou (Amina C records, 2016)

Albums featured
With Muhal Richard Abrams
 Lifea Blinec (Arista Novus, 1978)
 Spihumonesty (Black Saint, 1979)
 Duet (Black Saint, 1981)
With the Art Ensemble of Chicago
Salutes the Chicago Blues Tradition (AECO, 1993)
With Arthur Blythe
Blythe Spirit (Columbia, 1981)
With Lester Bowie
African Children (Horo, 1978)
 The Fifth Power (Black Saint, 1978)
The Organizer (DIW, 1991)
 Funky T. Cool T. (DIW, 1991) 
With Frank Lowe
Exotic Heartbreak (Soul Note, 1981)
With Maurice McIntyre
Humility in the Light of the Creator (Delmark, 1969)
With Greg Osby
Season of Renewal (JMT, 1990)
With Jim Pepper
Afro Indian Blues (recorded 1991, released 2006)
With Third Rail (James Blood Ulmer & Bill Laswell)
South Delta Space Age (Antilles, 1995)
With Henry Threadgill
X-75 Volume 1 (1979)
Subject to Change (1985)
Song Out of My Trees (1994)
With James Blood Ulmer
Blue Blood (2000)

References

Bibliography

External links
[ AllMusic page for Myers]
Amina Claudine Myers at AACM
 Amina Claudine Myers at centrojazztorino
Amina Claudine Myers at German Wikipedia
Amina Claudine Myers website 

1942 births
Living people
African-American pianists
American women jazz singers
American jazz singers
American jazz pianists
Avant-garde jazz pianists
Women jazz pianists
People from Conway County, Arkansas
Novus Records artists
20th-century American pianists
20th-century American women pianists
Jazz musicians from Texas
Jazz musicians from Arkansas
21st-century American pianists
21st-century American women pianists
Leo Records artists
African-American women musicians
20th-century African-American women
20th-century African-American people
20th-century African-American musicians
21st-century African-American women
21st-century African-American musicians